Garscadden Wood lies to the north of Drumchapel on the outskirts of Glasgow, Scotland. It is known locally as the Bluebell Woods. The wood can be accessed via Peel Glen Road in the west, Chesters Road in the east. It is bordered by Bearsden Golf Course to the north, and Drummore Road to the south.

Forests and woodlands of Scotland
Nature reserves in Scotland
Drumchapel